The 2020 Portuguese motorcycle Grand Prix (officially known as the Grande Prémio MEO de Portugal) was the fifteenth and final round of the 2020 Grand Prix motorcycle racing season and the fourteenth and final round of the 2020 MotoGP World Championship. It was held at the Algarve International Circuit in Portimão on 22 November 2020.

Enea Bastianini and Albert Arenas clinched the world championship title in Moto2 and Moto3 category respectively after a heartbeat finale in both classes. Both riders secured their respective first world championship title in their career on Grand Prix motorcycling level.

Background

Impact of the COVID-19 pandemic 

The opening rounds of the 2020 championship have been heavily affected by the COVID-19 pandemic. Several Grands Prix were cancelled or postponed after the opening round in Qatar was halted, prompting the Fédération Internationale de Motocyclisme to draft a new calendar. A new calendar based exclusively in Europe was announced on 11 June.
The Portuguese Grand Prix, absent from the calendar since 2012 (when it took place at the Autódromo do Estoril), was introduced as the last stage of the championship; this is the first time the season finale has not been held in Valencia since 2001. The race is held at the Autódromo Internacional do Algarve, which has served as MotoGP's reserve track since 2017; it is the first time that this circuit hosts a Grand Prix and is the seventy-third circuit which hosts a World Championship race.

MotoGP Championship standings before the race 
After having achieved the arithmetic certainty of winning the World Championship, Joan Mir leads the riders' standings with 171 points, 29 more than Franco Morbidelli who won the previous Grand Prix and gained three positions in the general classification. Álex Rins is third with 138 points, followed by Maverick Viñales and Fabio Quartararo with 127 and 125 points, respectively.

In the constructors' standings, Suzuki and Ducati are leading with 201 points, followed by Yamaha and KTM with 13 and 26 points behind. Honda is fifth at 133 points, while Aprilia closes the standings at 43 points.

In the team championship standings, Team Suzuki Ecstar took the title and leads with 309 points, 79 more than Petronas Yamaha SRT. KTM Factory Racing outstripped Ducati Team for third position (209 vs 203 points), with Monster Energy Yamaha fifth at 169 points.

Moto2 and Moto3 Championship riders' standings before the race 
In the intermediate class, four riders are still fighting for the title, with Enea Bastianini leading with 194 points, followed by Sam Lowes with 180 points. Luca Marini and Marco Bezzecchi are third and fourth at 176 and 171 points respectively.

In the lightweight class, there are still three drivers in the running with Albert Arenas first at 170 points, followed by Ai Ogura and Tony Arbolino with respectively 8 and 11 points behind.

MotoGP entrants 

 Stefan Bradl replaced Marc Márquez for the twelfth straight race while the latter recovered from injuries sustained in his opening round crash.
 Iker Lecuona, after having tested positive at the entrance to the Valencia paddock before the Valencian Community Grand Prix, is also forced to miss the Portuguese Grand Prix, being replaced by the official KTM test driver Mika Kallio.

Free practice

MotoGP 
In the first session, home rider Miguel Oliveira was the fastest ahead of Maverick Viñales and Aleix Espargaró. In the second session Johann Zarco took the lead, with Viñales and Espargaró confirming themselves as second and third. In the third session Jack Miller finished ahead of everyone, followed by Oliveira and Álex Rins. In the combined standings, the new world champion Joan Mir and the winner of the previous race Franco Morbidelli remain excluded from Q2.

Combined Free Practice 1-2-3 
The top ten riders (written in bold) qualified in Q2.

Personal Best lap

In the fourth session Pol Espargaró was the fastest ahead of Miguel Oliveira and Takaaki Nakagami.

Moto2 
In the combined free practice times table, Remy Gardner was the fastest ahead of Luca Marini and Héctor Garzó. Sam Lowes is fifth, championship leader Enea Bastianini is ninth while Marco Bezzecchi is fifteenth and does not enter directly into Q2.

Moto3 
In the free practice combined, Jaume Masiá was the fastest ahead of Albert Arenas and Jeremy Alcoba. Arenas 'opponents for the drivers' title, Ai Ogura and Tony Arbolino, are fifteenth and twenty-two and does not enter directly into Q2.

Qualifying

MotoGP

Moto2 
Remy Gardner took pole position with a time of 1:42.592, with Luca Marini second at +0.118 sec. and Fabio Di Giannantonio at +0.129 sec.. Enea Bastianini is fourth, followed by Sam Lowes. Marco Bezzecchi, after passing Q1, qualifies twelfth.

Moto3 
Raul Fernandez takes pole position with a time of 1:48.051, followed by Jeremy Alcoba at +0.185 sec. and from Ayumu Sasaki to +0.240 sec.. Among the contenders for the bikers' title, Ai Ogura beats Q1 and in Q2 qualifies fifth ahead of Albert Arenas, while Tony Arbolino does not exceed Q1 (thirteenth time) and finishes in twenty-seventh place.

Warm up

MotoGP 
In the warm up, Cal Crutchlow was the fastest ahead of teammate Takaaki Nakagami and Brad Binder.

Moto2 
Remy Gardner is the fastest biker also in the warm up, ahead of Jorge Martin and Luca Marini.

Moto3 
Jaume Masiá was placed in front of everyone, followed by Tony Arbolino and Dennis Foggia.

Race

MotoGP

Moto2

Moto3

Championship standings after the race
Below are the standings for the top five riders, constructors, and teams after the round.

MotoGP

Riders' Championship standings

Constructors' Championship standings

Teams' Championship standings

Moto2

Riders' Championship standings

Constructors' Championship standings

Teams' Championship standings

Moto3

Riders' Championship standings

Constructors' Championship standings

Teams' Championship standings

Notes

References

External links

Portuguese
Portuguese motorcycle Grand Prix
Portuguese motorcycle Grand Prix
Portuguese motorcycle Grand Prix